A Belisha beacon is an amber-coloured globe lamp atop a tall black and white striped pole, marking pedestrian crossings of roads in the United Kingdom, Ireland, and in other countries historically influenced by Britain such as Hong Kong, Malta, and Singapore. The beacons were named after Leslie Hore-Belisha (1893–1957), the Minister of Transport who, in 1934, added beacons to pedestrian crossings, marked by large metal studs in the road surface. These crossings were later painted in black and white stripes, and thus are known as zebra crossings. Legally, pedestrians have priority (over vehicles in the carriageway) on such crossings.

History 
The first Belisha beacons were erected in the London authorities areas and, following the Road Traffic Act 1934, were rolled out nationally in 1935. In December 1941 a study was made into the cost effectiveness of melting down the 64,000 Belisha beacon posts to make munitions, a plan which threatened to "deprive the right hon. Member for Devonport (Mr. Hore-Belisha) of his last hope of immortality".

In 1948, the Central Office of Information produced a short film which showed the correct way to use a pedestrian crossing (without the stripes at this time).

Belisha beacons provide additional visibility to zebra crossings for motorists, primarily at night. The UK flash rate is 750 ms on, 750 ms off. Some crossings are set so that each beacon flashes alternately to the other side, but they often fall out of synchronization over time.  Beacons with an outer ring of flashing amber LED lights, preferred for their brightness and low electricity consumption, are replacing traditional incandescent bulbs in many areas.

Some of the crossings have plastic poles that are translucent, and lit internally. This is immediately apparent in dull weather and at night. The clearly illuminated white sections announce the presence of the poles carrying the amber beacons, increasing the visibility of the crossings to all road users. These illuminated white sections can, however, obscure the presence of a pedestrian waiting to cross, as a driver cannot see the dark shape behind the brighter light coming from the pole.

To be legally compliant in the UK, every zebra crossing must be equipped with two Belisha beacons. In cases where there is a traffic island or central reservation in the road, the traffic authority can opt whether to place one or more beacons centrally. An exception is crossings over cycle paths, which do not need beacons.

Since the introduction of new regulations in 1997, the number of zebra crossings and Belisha beacons has fallen in the northern counties of England, being replaced by pelican crossings or puffin crossings, with pedestrian-controlled traffic signals; a waiting pedestrian can stop vehicular traffic by pressing a button and waiting for the pedestrian signal of a red and green man to change to green.

Outside the United Kingdom

Australia
In Australia, there has been a proliferation of various kinds of beacons and bollards, illuminated, reflective or otherwise designed for high visibility at pedestrian crossings, to which the name Belisha is occasionally erroneously applied. These high-visibility crossing markers are often placed on refuge islands in the middle of the road, in addition to or instead of at the roadside. Many of these new crossings are signposted that pedestrians must give way to traffic.

Brisbane briefly had a small number of Belisha beacon marked crossings in the late 1960s and early 1970s, but the majority of Australian crossings are zebra crossings marked by large yellow circular signs bearing a walking legs symbol.

Hong Kong
In Hong Kong, Belisha beacons are required by the Transport Department of Hong Kong at all unsignalized crossings, except for pedestrian crosswalks at entrances and exits at expressway crossings.

Ireland
In Ireland, Belisha beacons are usually accompanied by much higher visibility dual flashing amber traffic lights on either side. Some zebra crossings have only these rather than Belisha beacons.

In November 2022, the National Transport Authority began a pilot scheme with Limerick City and County Council and Dún Laoghaire-Rathdown County Council to trial the implementation of zebra crossings without Belisha beacons, instead using fixed blue mandatory signs such as are used in Continental Europe. These crossings will be cheaper and quicker to implement as they do not require an electrical connection.

New Zealand
Outside of the UK, Belisha beacons are perhaps most prominent in New Zealand, where they are required at all marked pedestrian crossings. Traffic regulations require a controlling authority to erect on each pole indicating the presence and position of a pedestrian crossing either an internally illuminated amber globe not less than 300 mm (12") in diameter, which has a lamp that provides 40 to 60 flashes per minute, or a 400 mm (16") diameter fluorescent orange disk. The pole must be erected within 2 metres (6') of each end of a crossing. The poles must be not less than 75 mm (3") in diameter and not less than 2 metres (6') in height, and must be clearly painted with alternate parallel bands of black and of white, each having a width of approximately 300 mm (12"). Disks are a relatively new addition as a replacement for illuminated globes, having only become prominent since the 1990s.

Poland
Belisha beacons were uncommon, but the Highway Code allowed for using them up until the early 1960s.

Netherlands
In the Netherlands, Belisha beacons were used from 1957 to 1962 to indicate that pedestrians had the right of way on a particular crossing. In 1962, a law was passed that extended this to all zebra crossings and the beacons were removed. However, some still exist in Vlaardingen. And, apparently, also in the media area in Hilversum.

Singapore
In Singapore, all zebra crossings are marked by Belisha beacons.

France and Spain
In France and Spain, a small number of pedestrian crossings are illuminated by special lamp posts that have flashing amber lights on their sides that play the same role as Belisha beacons.

Liberia
Belisha beacons ranged all over Liberian zebra crossings from 1960 to 2010 and some were still in use from 2010 to 2013.

Card game 
In the 1930s, there was a popular card game based on road safety that was called Belisha. It featured pictures of road scenes and a few notable places like Gretna Green and Robin Hood's Well. The gameplay was based on the game Rummy.

Images

Notes

References 

Pedestrian crossing components
1934 introductions
Walking in the United Kingdom
Orange symbols